Bruno Hartrell was a soccer executive who owned the Toronto Lynx.

Toronto Lynx
Hartrell purchased United Soccer League expansion franchise Toronto Lynx for $50,000. The club was in the first division until 2006 when they decided to move to the Premier Development League for the 2007 season.

Personal life
He is married to Nicole. He also owns an accounting firm.

References

Canadian soccer chairmen and investors
Canadian accountants